Neurotensin receptor type 2 is a protein that in humans is encoded by the NTSR2 gene.

Function 

The protein encoded by this gene belongs to the G protein-coupled receptor family that activates a phosphatidylinositol-calcium second messenger system. Binding and pharmacological studies demonstrate that this receptor binds neurotensin as well as several other ligands already described for neurotensin NT1 receptor. However, unlike NT1 receptor, this gene recognizes, with high affinity, levocabastine, a histamine H1 receptor antagonist previously shown to compete with neurotensin for low-affinity binding sites in the brain. These activities suggest that this receptor may be of physiological importance and that a natural agonist for the receptor may exist.

See also 
 Neurotensin receptor

References

Further reading

External links 
 

G protein-coupled receptors